Fosterville Gold Mine is a gold mine east of Bendigo in the Australian state of Victoria. As of 2022, it was the largest gold mine in Victoria.

The current mine was established by Newmarket Gold. Newmarket was taken over by Kirkland Lake Gold in 2016, and in turn that merged with Agnico Eagle Mines Limited in 2022.

Gold was first discovered in the Fosterville area in 1894 and mined from then until 1903. Mining operations restarted in 2003 by a forerunner of Kirkland Lake Gold. Commercial production from open pits was achieved in 2005 and underground mining commenced in 2006. In 2018, it was estimated to have at least six more years of operation.

References

Gold mines in Australia
Bendigo